Cascade Christian High School  is a private Christian high school in Medford, Oregon, United States.

History 
Cascade Christian High School was founded in 1977 by Grace Christian Schools, a ministry of the First Baptist Church, and was housed at the historic Jacksonville School building for over ten years.  The school's first graduating class was in 1981, but GCS turned the high school over to a group of dedicated parents to operate it separately.  In 2002 school leaders asked that Grace Christian administrators take over the administration.  After twenty years as afacility just south of the Rogue Valley International-Medford Airport for the 2007–08 school year.

Athletics 
Cascade Christian's high school athletic program began around the time the school did in 1977.  The mascot is known as the "Challengers" and the team colors are purple and gold.  The "Challenger" is a warrior-type character based out of the Bible.  The athletic director is Dave Fennell.

They are a member in good standing of the Oregon School Activities Association and participate in the Southern Cascade League and Sunset Conference.  Their football and basketball team won the OSAA Class 2A State Championship in 2006–07, as well as the 3A Basketball championship in 2008–09 and 2021-22. Their baseball team won the OSAA Class 3A State Championship in 2012.  All teams currently play in Class 3A based on school enrollment.

Varsity football, boys basketball and some baseball games are carried on the radio by KDOV-FM 91.7, The Dove with Jim McCoy and Mark McLemore on the call.

References

External links
 Cascade Christian High School website
 Cascade Christian Challengers athletics website
 Grace Christian Schools website

High schools in Jackson County, Oregon
Education in Medford, Oregon
Christian schools in Oregon
Schools accredited by the Northwest Accreditation Commission
Private high schools in Oregon
1978 establishments in Oregon